Heinz von Allmen (10 August 1913 – 11 November 2003 in Lauterbrunnen) was a Swiss Alpine skier and cross-country skier.

World Championships medals
One of Wengen's most successful ski racers, Heinz von Allmen won the following races:
1936 in Innsbruck - silver in Alpine combination
1934 in Mürren - bronze in downhill
1936 in Innsbruck - bronze in downhill
1934 in Mürren - bronze in Alpine combination

Heinz also won the Lauberhorn 7 times and the Swiss Ski Championships 9 times.

Brothers 
Heinz' two younger brothers, Marcel von Allmen and Otto von Allmen were also ski champions. Marcel was two-time winner of the Lauberhorn (1941 and 1944). Otto was 10 times Swiss ski champion, three times winner of the Lauberhorn, and champion of the Nordic/Alpine combined in 1944. The three brothers won 19 Swiss ski championship races, 19 Lauberhorn races, 4 World Championship races.  In the period leading up to, and during, World War II, the brothers (along with Hans Schlunegger, also of Wengen), were champions in the combined Nordic/Alpine disciplines, which were dropped after the war because of the difficulty of training for all four events.

References 

Swiss male alpine skiers
1913 births
2003 deaths
Sportspeople from Bern
20th-century Swiss people